Eurynora is a genus of moths in the subfamily Arctiinae.

Species
 Eurynora antepallida Strand, 1922
 Eurynora flavoeola Rothschild, 1912

References

Natural History Museum Lepidoptera generic names catalog

Lithosiini